Rocket Science is a BBC television documentary series, first broadcast in March 2009 on BBC Two, exploring new ways to teach science to children. Across the UK, fewer and fewer youngsters want to study chemistry and physics, so with the help of physics teacher Andy Smith, Rocket Science sets out to convert a small sample by teaching them everything safe there is to know about fireworks. The series was filmed over a period of nine months.

Episodes 

Andy Smith won the secondary school teacher of the year for the north west region in 2005. He has also filmed shows for the digital channel Teacher's TV. He is a big Doctor Who fan and has assisted in many conventions in which previous stars of the series attend, notably the Who in the Cavern, which raises money for the Liverpool children's hospital Alder Hey. He once famously presided over a quiz between fifth doctor Peter Davison and sixth doctor Colin Baker.

External links 
  
 Homepage of the director Andy Robbins with more information about the documentary: http://www.andyrobbins.info

BBC television documentaries about science
2009 British television series debuts
2009 British television series endings
Science education television series
2009 in science